State Highway 45 (SH 45) is a New Zealand state highway which has the moniker of the Surf Highway due to the number of prominent surfing breaks that are accessible from it.

It is two-line single carriageway for most of its length, with at-grade intersections and property access' in both urban and rural areas.

Route
SH 45 leaves  at the corner of Leach and Eliot streets north-east of the New Plymouth CBD. It then continues west along the New Plymouth one-way network (westbound Leach and Vivian streets, eastbound Powderham and Courtenay streets) then onto Devon St West and South Road exiting New Plymouth via the south-western suburbs. It then heads south-west along the Taranaki coastal plain passing through Oakura and Ōkato. At Cape Egmont it turns south-east following the coast passing the Oaonui production station and through Ōpunake and Manaia before terminating at the crossroad intersection of Waihi, Denby and South Roads in Hawera, where it again meets SH 3.

See also
 List of New Zealand state highways
 List of roads and highways, for notable or famous roads worldwide

References

External links
 New Zealand Transport Agency

45
New Plymouth District
Transport in Taranaki